Field Nation is an online matching service for IT contractors and other freelancers.

History

Field Nation CEO Mynul Khan began developing a web-based platform for a single client to manage the outsourcing of their IT work In 2004. The platform soon began generating 3 million in revenue, and in March 2008 Khan launched Field Nation. Within 2 years Field Nation broke even and by 2014 posted more than 60 million in revenue.

Field Nation acquired its direct competitor, Field Solutions in May 2015. As of the date of the acquisition Field Nation employed over 150 people. The platform has more than 100,000 signed up technicians.

In September 2015, Field Nation raised 30 million dollars in venture capital, led by Susquehanna Growth Equity, a subsidiary of Susquehanna International Group.

Software
Field Nation matches contract IT and other freelancers with corporate clients through an online marketplace made up of 100,000 service providers. Businesses use Field Nation's software to manage independent contractors, existing employees, or both.

Service providers create a profile listing their skills, experience, relevant licenses, background checks, security clearances, and performance rating. Information can be entered manually or imported from other social platforms such as LinkedIn. The Field Nation mobile app provides real-time work order tracking, ability to negotiate counteroffers, access to payment history, signature capture, and uploading of documents.

Recognition
Field Nation has ranked two years in a row in the Inc. 500, a list of the fastest growing companies in America. They were ranked 43rd in the United States in 2013 and 445th in 2014. They were ranked 4th fastest growing company in Minnesota in 2014.

Field Nation was recognized by the Minneapolis/St. Paul Business Journal as one of 2013's Fast 50 companies. The list features the fastest growing private companies based on revenue growth.  Field Nation was ranked Minnesota's 2nd fastest growing private company.

CEO Mynul Khan was named 1 of 10 Minnesota business leaders to watch in 2015 by the Star Tribune.

Field Nation received the 2015 Tekne award for IT services awarded by the Minnesota High Tech Association (MHTA).

Named to Star Tribune's 2017 list of top places to work.

References

External links
 

Online marketplaces of the United States
Freelance marketplace websites
Employment websites in the United States
Software companies based in Minneapolis